The Peck Bros. and Bartle Tire Service Company Building, also known as the Photo Art Building, is a building located in downtown Portland, Oregon, United States, listed on the National Register of Historic Places.

It was designed by architect Charles W. Ertz to serve the Peck Bros. and Bartle company, a tire sales and service firm. It was renovated in 1973 to serve the Photo Art Commercial Photographers.

It had a tire sales area and a large garage area for tire and auto service on the first floor.

See also
 National Register of Historic Places listings in Southwest Portland, Oregon

References

External links

1927 establishments in Oregon
Commercial buildings completed in 1927
Commercial buildings on the National Register of Historic Places in Oregon
Mission Revival architecture in Oregon
National Register of Historic Places in Portland, Oregon
Southwest Portland, Oregon
Spanish Revival architecture in Oregon
Tires
Transportation buildings and structures on the National Register of Historic Places in Oregon